On January 14, 2016, two Sikorsky CH-53E Super Stallion helicopters of the United States Marine Corps reportedly collided over the Pacific Ocean, off Oahu's North Shore, in Hawaii. Each helicopter had six U.S. Marines aboard. A search and rescue operation was undertaken, and a debris field from the two craft was located. On January 20, the twelve crew members were declared deceased.

In April, 2016, the remains of nine of the twelve crew members were recovered, as well as large portions of the wreckage. Three of the crew members have never been found.

Accident and rescue operation

The two aircraft departed in the late evening hours on a routine training mission, from the Marine Corps Air Station Kaneohe Bay, and flew over the North Shore in the vicinity of Haleiwa. Local residents later reported hearing two distinct explosions. A resident on a beach reported seeing the two helicopters flying in the distance, then a fireball.

A massive search and rescue operation was undertaken, involving the United States Air Force, Coast Guard, Marines, Army MEDEVAC helicopter crews and Navy, along with the Honolulu Fire Department and Police Department. The search and rescue operation ended on January 19. All four of the life rafts were also found on the surface during the 5-day search, but there was no evidence that they had ever been used by the helicopter crews.

Aftermath
On January 20, Secretary of Defense Ash Carter made a statement honoring the crew members. "These proud Marines died as they lived, in service to a country they loved and in dedication to a cause greater than themselves," Carter said. Carter thanked the Air Force, Coast Guard, Navy, and Marine personnel for their involvement in rescue operations. A memorial service for the lost Marines was held Friday, January 22 at Marine Corps Base Hawaii.

The two helicopters belonged to the 1st Marine Aircraft Wing. The twelve Marines on board were all from the contiguous United States. Two each were from Alabama, Pennsylvania, and Texas; and one each were from Florida, Massachusetts, Minnesota, Missouri, Oregon and South Carolina.

Investigation
The Marine Corps will lead an investigation into the incident, which will include salvaging the fuselages of the two helicopters. The wreckage was located approximately two miles off shore, under 325 feet of water. The announced recovery operation included plans to find the remains of the missing crew, so they can be returned to their families. A board will review the evidence surrounding the crash.

References

2016 in Hawaii
Accidents and incidents involving the Sikorsky CH-53E Super Stallion
Accidents and incidents involving United States Navy and Marine Corps aircraft
Aviation accidents and incidents in the United States in 2016
Aviation accidents and incidents in Hawaii
History of Oahu
January 2016 events in the United States
United States Marine Corps in the 21st century